Vasile Hanuseac (born 3 April 1970) is a Romanian rower. He competed in the men's coxless four event at the 1992 Summer Olympics.

References

1970 births
Living people
Romanian male rowers
Olympic rowers of Romania
Rowers at the 1992 Summer Olympics
Place of birth missing (living people)